Volcanoville is an unincorporated community in El Dorado County, California.

A post office operated at Volcanoville from 1930 to 1953. The name is due to early miners' mistaken belief that a nearby mountain was an extinct volcano.

Education
The Black Oak Mine Unified School District serves Garden Valley.

Mosquito Fire
Several structures in Volcanoville were destroyed in the Mosquito Fire, a large, destructive wildfire that burned near the community of Foresthill in the Tahoe and Eldorado National Forests in Placer and El Dorado counties in California in September and October 2022.

References

Unincorporated communities in California
Unincorporated communities in El Dorado County, California